Colin McWilliam (1928–1989) was a British architecture academic and author.

Career
Born in London, he graduated from the University of Cambridge and became Director of the Scottish National Buildings Record, then the Assistant Secretary of the National Trust for Scotland. He also directed architectural history and conservation at Edinburgh College of Art, and later Heriot-Watt University. He was a founder of the Dictionary of Scottish Architects Project, and was instrumental in setting up the Architectural Heritage Society of Scotland.

Studying at the British School in Rome he returned to Scotland in 1951 to work with architect Stewart Kaye and with the National Building Record.

From 1965 to 1972 McWilliam was a Council member of the influential Edinburgh conservationist group the Cockburn Association.

In the 1970s, he was approached by Sir Nikolaus Pevsner who, having completed the series The Buildings of England, was keen to extend the project to cover the rest of the UK. McWilliam went on to co-write two volumes in The Buildings of Scotland series and became the project's editor.

He designed a desk and a bookcase incorporating copies of a portrait medallion of Robert Adam by James Tassie, for the Cabinet Room in Bute House, the official residence of the First Minister of Scotland.

Colin McWilliam is commemorated on a plaque in Greyfriars Kirkyard in Edinburgh. He was the father of the author Candia McWilliam.

Publications

Culross: A Short Guide (1962)
Scottish Townscape (1975)
Lothian, except Edinburgh. Buildings of Scotland (1978)
Edinburgh. Buildings of Scotland. (1984) (with David Walker and John Gifford)

References

External links
Dictionary of Scottish Architects Project
Pevsner Architectural Guides

1928 births
1989 deaths
Scottish architecture writers
Scottish art critics
Scottish art historians
Scottish curators
People associated with Edinburgh
Academics of Heriot-Watt University
Alumni of the University of Cambridge
Edinburgh College of Art
Architecture academics
20th-century British historians